The sixth season of the Australian competitive cooking competition show My Kitchen Rules premiered on the Seven Network on Monday 2 February 2015.

For the first time since 2012, My Kitchen Rules was beaten by MasterChef Australia in the 'Winner Announced' TV ratings.

Format changes
New Instant Restaurant Rounds
Colin's Secret Round — For the first time, six teams competed in a third group of instant restaurants with judge, Colin Fassnidge. It is the first time Colin has made an appearance in the instant restaurant round.
Redemption Round — The teams who placed 4th and 5th in their respective instant restaurant groups were combined and competed in another instant restaurant round. 
Challenge Round Format — After the People's Choice challenge, two teams are sent directly into Sudden Death, skipping the past process of a kitchen cook-off to determine the second team. As a result, teams who pass the People's Choice are deemed safe and the winner becomes safe from two eliminations.
Judging Panel Changes — For the off-site People's Choice challenges, Colin Fassnidge joined Pete Evans as a co-judge for the teams cooking, while Manu is present for cook-offs held in Kitchen Headquarters. During Sudden Death Cook-Offs, Colin continues to be a part of the blind tasting panel, along with the regular three guest judges.

Teams

Elimination history

Competition details

Instant Restaurants
During the Instant Restaurant rounds, each team hosts a three-course dinner for judges and fellow teams in their allocated group. They are scored and ranked among their group, with the lowest scoring team being eliminated.

Round 1
 Episodes 1 to 6
 Airdate — 2 February to 10 February
 Description — The first of the two instant restaurant groups are introduced into the competition in Round 1. The lowest scoring team at the end of this round is eliminated.

Round 2
 Episodes 7 to 12
 Airdate — 11 February to 18 February
 Description — The second group now start their Instant Restaurant round. The same rules from the previous round apply and the lowest scoring team is eliminated.

Round 3: Colin's Secret Round
 Episodes 13 to 18
 Airdate — 19 February to 2 March
 Description — A new group of 6 teams entered the competition and competed in a 'secret round' of instant restaurants. This round was not judged by Pete and Manu, but instead by Colin Fassnidge. The same rules applied and the lowest scoring team is eliminated. Since Colin was the only judge for this round his Scores were doubled.

Round 4: Redemption Round
 Episodes 19 to 24
 Airdate — 3 March to 11 March
 Description — The 4th and 5th placed teams from the previous three groups must cook again in a redemption round. Pete and Manu return as the judges, and the lowest scoring team is eliminated.

Top 14

People's Choice 1: Camping Challenge
 Episode 25
 Airdate — 12 March 2015
 Location — The Basin, New South Wales
 Description — The teams headed into the first challenge to serve a breakfast dish for 200 hungry campers. The campers voted for their favourite dish and the team with the most votes received People's Choice, sending that team safe from two eliminations. Judges Pete and Colin sent the two weakest teams directly into the first Sudden Death Cook-Off. Teams who won the previous instant restaurant rounds were automatically safe from elimination and did not participate in this challenge. All other surviving teams advance to the Top 13.

Sudden Death Cook-Off 1
 Episode 26
 Airdate — 16 March 2015
 Description — Annie & Lloyd and Vicky & Celine did not impress the judges at the Camping Challenge, so they must go head to head in the first Sudden Death Cook-Off. The team with the lower score will be eliminated and the surviving team will proceed through to the Top 13.

Top 13

People's Choice 2: Farmer's Challenge 
 Episode 27
 Airdate — 17 March 2015
 Location — Australia
 Description — Teams cooked for the farmers, highlighting their produce as a way of saying thanks for all their hard work supplying it. Teams were each allocated a main ingredient to highlight in their dish and were split into two groups, first group cooking savoury and the second cooking sweets. Farmer's voted for the favourite dish awarding one team the Farmer's Choice, making them safe from two eliminations, while the judges sent to two weakest teams into Sudden Death.

Sudden Death Cook-Off 2
 Episode 28
 Airdate — 18 March 2015
 Description — Eva & Debra and Sheri & Emilie must compete in the second Sudden Death Cook-Off after they disappointed the judges at the Farmer's Challenge. The lower scoring team will be eliminated and the surviving team proceeds to the Top 12.

Top 12 → Top 11
This should be the Top 12 round, however after team Vicky and Celine voluntarily withdrew from the competition because of Celine's bad health condition, it has become the Top 11 round.

People's Choice 3: Pub Crawl
 Episode 29
 Airdate — 19 March 2015
 Location — Balmain, New South Wales
 Description — Teams took charge of pubs around Balmain in Sydney to cook for the lunch-time pub crawl and had to prepare meals to service for paying customers. Two teams were assigned to a pub, and diners paid for what they believed the meal was worth. The team who raises the most money is awarded People's Choice and like the previous rounds, judges Pete and Colin sent the weakest two teams to Sudden Death.

Sudden Death Cook-Off 3
 Episode 30
 Airdate — 23 March 2015
 Description — Rob & Dave and Robert & Lynzey failed to impress the judges at the Pub Crawl, so they have to compete against each other in a Sudden Death Cook-Off, where one team will be eliminated. The other team goes through to the Top 10.

Top 10

People's Choice 4: Wedding Challenge
 Episode 31
 Airdate — 24 March 2015
 Location — Burnham Grove, Cawdor, New South Wales
 Description — For this challenge, the teams catered for a wedding reception with a Modern Australian theme in mind. Three teams focused on one course each (entree, main, dessert), with 90 minutes prep time and then 30 minutes for service per course. All guests voted for the People's Choice and judges Pete and Colin sent the weakest two teams to Sudden Death.

Sudden Death Cook-Off 4
 Episode 32
 Airdate — 25 March 2015
 Description — After a poor performance at the Wedding Challenge, Jane and Emma face against Rob and Dave in the Sudden Death Cook-Off. For Rob and Dave, they are the first team so far to compete in a Sudden Death Cook-Off more than once. The lower scoring team is eliminated and the surviving team proceeds to the Top 9.

Top 9

People's Choice 5: Garden Challenge
 Episode 33
 Airdate — 6 April 2015
 Location — Melbourne, Victoria
 Description — Teams created canapés for a harvest party using the fresh produce from pop-up garden patches located in Melbourne's St Kilda and Federation Square. The team with the most votes will be People's Choice and safe from the next two eliminations, whilst the two weakest teams head to the next Sudden Death Cook-Off, where one team will be eliminated.

Sudden Death Cook-Off 5
 Episode 34
 Airdate — 7 April 2015
 Description — Will & Steve and Carol & Adam must compete against each other in the Sudden Death Cook-Off, after a poor performance at the Garden Challenge. The lower scoring team will be eliminated and the surviving team will go through to the Top 8.

Top 8

People's Choice 6: Luna Park Challenge
 Episode 35
 Airdate — 8 April 2015
 Location — Luna Park Sydney
 Description — Teams headed to Sydney's Luna Park to serve fairground food to emergency service workers and families for the annual 'Give Back' day. The public voted for their favourite dish sending that team straight to the Top 6 as the bottom two compete in another Sudden Death.

Sudden Death Cook-Off 6
 Episode 36
 Airdate — 12 April 2015
 Description — Unfortunately, Drasko & Bianca and Rose & Josh didn't impress the judges in the Luna Park Challenge. They now must compete in a Sudden Death Cook-Off. The lower scoring team will be eliminated and the safe team will advance to the Top 7.

Top 7

People's Choice 7: Jetstar In-Flight Challenge
 Episode 37
 Airdate — 13 April 2015
 Location — Sydney Airport, Jetstar Flight JQ7001
 Description — For this challenge teams prepared and cooked in-flight meals for Jetstar flight passengers. Each team prepared 40 portions of their meal to be served to on-board passengers for scoring out of 10. The team who receives the highest score, wins the Passenger's choice and will have their meal served on select Jetstar flights for three months. The judges once again sent the two weakest teams to Sudden Death.

Sudden Death Cook-Off 7
 Episode 38
 Airdate — 14 April 2015
 Description — Eva & Debra take on Kat & Andre in a Sudden Death Cook-Off. The lower scoring team is eliminated and the other team proceeds to the Top 6 Finals Decider.

Top 6: Finals Decider
In the Top 6 round, teams competed in a number of cook-offs held in Kitchen Headquarters. At the end of this round, five teams advance into the finals. This also sees the return of the Rapid cook-off and Showdown challenges, which have so far been omitted this season.

Kitchen Cook-Off
 Episode 39
 Airdate — 15 April 2015
 Description
Rapid Cook-off: Street Food — Teams were challenged to cook a street food dish in 30 minutes. The winner of this cook-off earned an advantage for the following Showdown challenge.
Showdown: Fine Dining — In the Showdown, teams were challenged to create a fine dining style dish. This was a head to head challenge, where one team faced off against another. The winner's advantage from the previous cook-off was the ability to set the match-ups between the teams. Three winners of the head to heads were safe and advance to the Top 5, while the bottom 3 head into an elimination knockout round.

Knock-Out Round
 Episode 40
 Airdate — 19 April 2015
 Description — The bottom three teams from the previous finals decider challenge face off against each other in a three-round knockout. In the first round, teams must neatly segment citrus fruits. The team who did the best job, earned an advantage for the second round. In round two, teams must cook a vegetarian dish in 45 minutes. The winner's advantage was the ability to select the main ingredient for each team to use. These included; mushrooms, cauliflower and okra. After this round, one team is safe as the other two compete in a final Sudden Death round, each creating their own 'signature dish', to determine the last team to join the Top 5 and another elimination.

Top 5

Ultimate Instant Restaurant
 Episodes 41 to 45
 Airdate — 20 to 27 April 2015
 Description — For the start of the finals round, the Top 5 teams head around the country once again in an Ultimate Instant Restaurant round. All teams have to cook two dishes of each course (entree, main and dessert) for their fellow finalists and judges for scoring. Guests have a choice of choosing one of the options per course while the judges Pete and Manu each taste one of the two options. The lowest scoring team is eliminated as the remaining four teams are ranked into the semifinals.

 Colour key:
  – Judge's score for course option 1
  – Judge's score for course option 2

Semi-finals

Semi-final 1
 Episode 46
 Airdate — 28 April 2015
 Description — Ash & Camilla take on Will & Steve in the first Semi-Final Cook-Off. The lower scoring team is eliminated and the winner proceeds through to the Grand Final.

Semi-final 2
 Episode 47
 Airdate — 3 May 2015
 Description — Eva & Debra take on Jac & Shaz in the second Semi-Final Cook-Off. The lower scoring team is eliminated and the other team becomes the second team to proceed into the Grand Final.

Grand Final
 Episode 48
 Airdate — 4 May 2015
 Description — In the final cook-off for the series, the top 2 teams face-off in the ultimate Grand Final. Teams each cook a five course degustation in the format of a cold entree, hot entree, seafood main, meat main and dessert. 20 plates of each course, totalling 100 plates per team were served to all eliminated teams, friends and family. Guest judges returned for the final verdict of awarding the $250,000 prize to the winners. Teams also wear chef attire and have their Instant Restaurant represented.

Ratings
 Colour key:
  – Highest rating during the series
  – Lowest rating during the series
  – An elimination was held in this episode
  – Finals week

References

2015 Australian television seasons
My Kitchen Rules